
In information theory and communication, the Slepian–Wolf coding, also known as the Slepian–Wolf bound, is a result in distributed source coding discovered by David Slepian and Jack Wolf in 1973.  It is a method of theoretically coding two lossless compressed correlated sources.

Problem setup
Distributed coding is the coding of two, in this case, or more dependent sources with separate encoders and a joint decoder.

Theorem
The bound for the lossless coding rates as shown below:
 
 
 

However, with joint decoding, if vanishing error probability for long sequences is accepted, the Slepian–Wolf theorem shows that much better compression rate can be achieved.

A special case of distributed coding is compression with decoder side information, where source  is available at the decoder side but not accessible at the encoder side.  This can be treated as the condition that  has already been used to encode , while we intend to use  to encode .  In other words, two isolated sources can compress data as efficiently as if they were communicating with each other.  The whole system is operating in an asymmetric way (compression rate for the two sources are asymmetric).

This bound has been extended to the case of more than two correlated sources by Thomas M. Cover in 1975, and similar results were obtained in 1976 by Aaron D. Wyner and Jacob Ziv with regard to lossy coding of joint Gaussian sources.

See also
 Data compression
 Data synchronization
 Synchronization (computer science)
 DISCUS
 Timeline of information theory

References

Sources

External links

 Wyner-Ziv Coding of Video algorithm for video compression that performs close to the Slepian–Wolf bound (with links to source code).

Error detection and correction